The Westerner is a 1934 American Western film directed by David Selman and starring Tim McCoy, Marion Shilling and Joe Sawyer. It was released by Columbia Pictures.

Michael R. Pitts generally praised the film, noting a "well staged" mock execution, while criticising its complex plot.

Plot summary

Cast
 Tim McCoy as Tim Addison
 Marion Shilling as Justina Barnes
 Joe Sawyer as Bob Lockhart
 Hooper Atchleyas Wayne Wallace
 John Dilson as Senator Lockhart
 Edward La Saint as Zach Addison
 Harry Todd as Uncle Ben
 Edmond Cobb as Joe Allen
 Albert J. Smith as Sheriff
 Paul Fix as Rustler Who Confesses

References

External links
 
 
 
 

1934 films
1930s English-language films
American Western (genre) films
Columbia Pictures films
1934 Western (genre) films
American black-and-white films
Films directed by David Selman
1930s American films